First Cabinet of Marek Belka was appointed on 5 August 2004. It failed a vote of confidence in parliament on 14 August 2004.

The Cabinet

Belka, Marek, First
Cabinet of Marek Belka, First
2004 establishments in Poland
2004 disestablishments in Poland
Cabinets established in 2004
Cabinets disestablished in 2004